Hans-Peter Hammel better known as -minu (pronounced "meenoo"),,  (born 16 June 1947) is a Swiss journalist. He was born in Basel and hosted a cooking show, Kuchiklatsch.

Books 
 -minu's Basler Küche (-minu's Basel cooking), published by Opinio Verlag, Basel, 2003 
 Von Menschen und Dingen (About People and Things), published by Verlag Dr. Kovac, 
 Alltagsgeschichten: Band 7 (Stories of Everyday Life), published by Opinio Verlag, Basel 
 Basel z'nacht: Ein Foto-Album mit poetischen Texten (Basel T'night: A photo album with poetic texts), published by GS-Verlag, Basel 
 Weihnachtsgeschichten – ein bisschen anders (Christmas Stories - a bit differently), published in September 2004 by Opinio Verlag, Basel

References

External links 
  (in German)

1947 births
Living people
Swiss columnists
Writers from Basel-Stadt
Swiss journalists